Nereide may refer to:
Italian submarine Nereide
Nereide (horse)
 Nereide (HBC vessel), operated by the HBC from 1833 to 1840, see Hudson's Bay Company vessels

See also
Nereid (disambiguation)